Touch Up may refer to:

Touch Up, function in Portrait Professional
Touch Up, product in Nice 'n Easy (hair coloring) 
Touch Up (Mother Mother album)

See also
"Touch Me Up", single by Aretha Franklin from Sweet Passion	1977